Killincoole is a civil parish in County Louth Ireland. It consists of three townlands:
 Allardstown, to the north
 Killincoole, to the south
 Rathneety, to the west

It is about 4 miles south of Lurgan-Green on the road from Ardee to Dundalk. In 1839 it had a population of 770.

Killincoole Castle

The castle stands on private land, part of a farm. It is a four-storey tower which has a vaulted basement and two D-shaped turrets. A staircase is located in the turret beside the east facing entrance.

References

County Louth